Francisco Ricardo Oves-Fernandez (October 4, 1928 in Camagüey, Cuba – December 4, 1990 in El Paso, Texas, US) was the archbishop of the Archdiocese of Havana.

He studied in the Seminary of San Basilio Magno, El Cobre, Oriente, Cuba. He was later sent by the Archbishop of Santiago de Cuba, Mons. Enrique Pérez-Serantes, to study at the Pontificia Universidad de Comillas in Spain.

He was ordained a priest on April 13, 1952, by Mons. Enrique Pérez-Serantes, archbishop of Santiago de Cuba, in the Cathedral of Camagüey. In the diocese of Camagüey he was assigned to the parish of Santa Cruz del Sur from 1952 to 1961 and director of TV programing. After the Cuban revolution of 1959, he was one of the first priests to realize the Marxist-Leninist orientation of the revolution. In April 1961, after the failed Bay of Pigs Invasion, he was expelled from Camagüey along with other members of the clergy.  He took refuge in Havana along with Mons. Eduardo Boza-Masvidal, Auxiliary Bishop of Havana. In September 1961, he was exiled to Spain on the ship Covadonga along with Mons. Boza and more than another 150 priests.  He went to Rome with Mons. Boza and Father Agnelio Blanco and had an interview with Pope John XXIII.  While in Rome he received a Doctorate in Social Sciences from Pontificia Universidad de Santo Tomás de Aquino. In 1965, the head of mission of the Vatican in Cuba Mons. Cesare Zacchi, was able to get Father Oves returned to Cuba.  The Bishop of Camagüey, Mons. Adolfo Rodríguez-Herrera opposed his return to Cuba.  He was a professor at the San Carlos and San Ambrosio Seminary in Havana.

He was elevated as Titular Bishop of Montecorvino and named auxiliary bishop of Cienfuegos by Pope Paul VI on April 25, 1969. He was consecrated in the Cathedral of Cienfuegos on July 16, 1969, by Mons. Cesare Zacchi, Titular Bishop of Zella, and assisted by Mons. Alfredo Muller-San Martin, Bishop of Cienfuegos and Mons. Adolfo Rodríguez-Herrera, Bishop of Camagüey. He was promoted as Archbishop of Havana on January 26, 1970, succeeding Mons. Evelio Díaz-Cía. He later became sick from nerves and was taken to Rome in the beginning of 1980.  The Pope designated an apostolic administrator, sede plena, for the Archdiocese of Havana Mons. Pedro Meurice Estiu, on February 20, 1980. He resigned his position on March 28, 1981. He was succeeded by Mons. Jaime Lucas Ortega y Alamino, the Bishop of the Diocese of Pinar del Río. In 1982, he went to live in El Paso, Texas, USA and was assigned to the parish of Santo Niño de Atocha.

He died on December 4, 1990, in El Paso, Texas, of a heart attack. His body was transferred to Miami, Florida and his body was displayed at the Shrine of Nuestra Señora de la Caridad del Cobre on Sunday, December 8, 1990. The funeral took place at the Cathedral of Saint Mary the following day. The mass was celebrated by Mons. Jaime Lucas Ortega y Alamino, Archbishop of Havana, the successor of Mons. Oves, who traveled from Cuba to assist in the Mass, Mons. Agustin Roman, auxiliary bishop of the Archdiocese of Miami, Mons. Enrique San Pedro, S.J., Auxiliary Bishop of the Diocese of Galveston-Houston, Mons. Roberto Octavio González, O.F.M., Auxiliary Bishop of the Archdiocese of Boston, and 44 other priests, mainly Cubans exiles. He was buried at Our Lady of Mercy Cemetery, in the area reserved for bishops and priests. A second funeral mass was celebrated in the Cathedral of Havana on December 13 presided by Archbishop Ortega.

References
 .
 .

1928 births
1990 deaths
20th-century Roman Catholic archbishops in Croatia
Roman Catholic archbishops of Havana
Roman Catholic bishops of Cienfuegos
Roman Catholic bishops of Havana